Maggie Renzi (born November 30, 1951) is an American film producer and actress.

Personal life
Renzi attended Williams College, where she met her life partner John Sayles. She graduated from Williams College in 1973.

Filmography

References

External links
 

1951 births
Living people
American film actresses
American film producers
Williams College alumni
American women film producers
21st-century American women